In the Battle of Cervera (4 to 14 October 1811) a Spanish force led by Luis Roberto de Lacy attacked a series of Imperial French garrisons belonging to the VII Corps of Marshal Jacques MacDonald. The actions were highly successful and netted nearly 1,000 enemy prisoners. The clashes occurred during the Peninsular War, part of the Napoleonic Wars.

Background
After the Army of Catalonia was nearly destroyed in the sieges of Tarragona and Figueres during July and August 1811, Lacy replaced Luis González Torres de Navarra, Marquess of Campoverde as Captain General. Marshal Louis Gabriel Suchet struck another blow against the Catalans when his troops seized the miquelet base in the Battle of Montserrat on 25 July 1811. The unpopular but vigorous Lacy quickly reorganized the 8,000-man remnant of his army into three small divisions under Generals Baron de Eroles, Pedro Sarsfield, and Francisco Milans del Bosch. With the Royal Navy's assistance, Lacy seized the Medes Islands at the mouth of the Ter River on 12 September.

Battle
On 4 October 1811, Lacy's forces captured 200 Imperial troops at Igualada on the highway between Barcelona and Lleida. Continuing west, the Spanish column seized a French convoy near Cervera on the 7th. Lacy overwhelmed the garrison of Cervera on 11 October, bagging another 645 prisoners. Finally, on the 14th the Spaniards took 150 more captives at Bellpuig. After these defeats, the French evacuated the monastery of Santa Maria de Montserrat on Montserrat Mountain.

Notes

References

Further reading

External links
 

Battles of the Peninsular War
Battles of the Napoleonic Wars
Battles involving Spain
Battles involving France
Battles in Catalonia
Conflicts in 1811
October 1811 events